Bad Rap may refer to:
 BAD RAP (organization), an animal welfare and rescue group based on Oakland, California
 Bad Rap (film), a 2016 American documentary featuring Asian American rappers
 Bad Rap, a Hardy Boys novel
 "Bad Rap", an episode from Super Mario World